Matthew Herbert (born 1972) is a British musician.

Matthew Herbert may also refer to:

 Matthew Herbert (died 1603), MP
 Matthew Herbert (died 1611) (1563–1611), MP